Vladimir Igorevich Svizhuk (born 12 September 1983) is a former Russian professional footballer.

Club career
He played 3 seasons in the Russian Football National League for FC SKA-Energiya Khabarovsk.

References

External links
 

1983 births
Footballers from Moscow
Living people
Russian footballers
Russian expatriate footballers
Association football forwards
FC SKA-Khabarovsk players
FC Vitebsk players
FC Zhenis Astana players
FC Lokomotiv Moscow players
Belarusian Premier League players
Kazakhstan Premier League players
Expatriate footballers in Belarus
Expatriate footballers in Kazakhstan
Russian expatriate sportspeople in Kazakhstan
FC Olimp-Dolgoprudny players